Eumitra apheles is a species of sea snail, a marine gastropod mollusk, in the family Mitridae, the miters or miter snails.

Description
The length of the shell attains 15.6 mm.

Distribution
This marine species occurs off New Caledonia.

References

apheles
Gastropods described in 1991